Silver Range is a 1946 American Western film directed by Lambert Hillyer and written by J. Benton Cheney. The film stars Johnny Mack Brown, Raymond Hatton, Jan Bryant, I. Stanford Jolley, Terry Frost and Eddie Parker. The film was released on November 16, 1946, by Monogram Pictures.

Plot

Cast         
Johnny Mack Brown as Johnny Bronton
Raymond Hatton as Tucson Smith
Jan Bryant as Jeanne Willoughby
I. Stanford Jolley as Sheriff Bill Armstrong
Terry Frost as Red Cameron
Eddie Parker as Bart Nelson
Ted Adams as Jason Turner
Frank LaRue as Steve Ferguson 
Cactus Mack as Larry 
Lane Bradford as Browning 
Dee Cooper as Faro
Billy Dix as Chuck 
Bill Willmering as Jim Willoughby

References

External links
 

1946 films
1940s English-language films
American Western (genre) films
1946 Western (genre) films
Monogram Pictures films
Films directed by Lambert Hillyer
American black-and-white films
1940s American films